Simon Larose (born June 28, 1978) is a former professional tennis player. He was Canada's top-ranked singles player for some months during 2003 and 2004. Larose retired from the tour shortly after being banned for two years for substance abuse.

Larose was born in Cap-de-la-Madeleine, Quebec, Canada. He joined the ATP professional tour at the age of 20 in 1998 having played collegiately at Mississippi State University. He was Canada's top-ranked singles player, according to the ATP rankings, in 2003 from January 6 until February 3, from May 19 until June 23, and from August 18 until October 13, and again in 2004 from July 12 until August 2. His best singles ATP ranking is World No. 189, which he achieved in July, 2004.

Although Larose did not make any official announcement, he was quoted in the press as saying that he retired from tennis after being levied a two-year ban in February 2005 by the ATP for testing positive for cocaine. At the time of his supposed cocaine use, he had been out of action with a back injury.

Since his retirement from the ATP circuit Larose has been coaching at a local tennis club, moving on to coach for Tennis Canada.

Simon made Canadian radio history when he provided analysis on the first-ever Canadian English language production of the 2010 Rogers Cup tennis final along with CJAD 800's Rick Moffat (play-by-play) and Mark Shalhoub (courtside reporter).

Larose provided CJAD 800 coverage for the 2012 Rogers Cup and returns to the booth August 10–11 for the Men's Singles Semis and Final.

Larose has been successful as a coach. He was appointed the Canadian National team's head coach  and has coached Rebecca Marino and Francoise Abanda.

See also
List of sportspeople sanctioned for doping offences

External links
 
 
 

1978 births
Canadian expatriate sportspeople in the United States
Canadian male tennis players
Canadian sportspeople in doping cases
Doping cases in tennis
French Quebecers
Living people
Mississippi State Bulldogs tennis players
Racket sportspeople from Quebec
Sportspeople from Trois-Rivières